Davor Erjavec (born 28 February 1970) is a German water polo player. He competed in the men's tournament at the 1996 Summer Olympics.

References

1970 births
Living people
German male water polo players
Olympic water polo players of Germany
Water polo players at the 1996 Summer Olympics
Sportspeople from Zagreb